América is a community located in  Nuevo Laredo. According to the INEGI Census of 2010, América has a population of 255 inhabitants. Its elevation is 140 meters above sea level.

References 

Populated places in Tamaulipas
Laredo–Nuevo Laredo